The Plurinational Legislative Assembly is the national legislature of Bolivia, placed in La Paz, the country's seat of government.

The assembly is bicameral, consisting of a lower house (the Chamber of Deputies or Cámara de Diputados) and an upper house (the Chamber of Senators, or Cámara de Senadores). The Vice President of Bolivia also serves as the ex officio President of the Plurinational Legislative Assembly. Each house elects its own directorate: a President, first and second Vice Presidents, and three or four Secretaries (for the Senate and the Chamber of Deputies, respectively). Each party is said to have a seat consisting of its legislators. The representatives of each department comprise a brigade (brigada). Each house considers legislation in standing committees.

The Chamber of Senators has 36 seats. Each of the country's nine departments returns four senators elected by proportional representation (using the D'Hondt method). (From 1985 to 2009, the Senate had 27 seats: three seats per department: two from the party or formula that receives the most votes, with the third senator representing the second-placed party.) Senators are elected from party lists to serve five-year terms, and the minimum age to hold a Senate seat is 35 years.

The Chamber of Deputies comprises 130 seats, elected using the additional member system: 70 deputies are elected to represent single-member electoral districts, 7 of which are Indigenous or Campesino seats elected by the usos y costumbres of minority groups, 60 are elected by proportional representation from party lists on a departmental basis. Deputies also serve five-year terms, and must be aged at least 25 on the day of the election. Party lists are required to alternate between men and women, and in the single-member districts, men are required to run with a female alternate, and vice versa. At least 50% of the deputies from single-member districts are required to be women.

Both the Chamber of Senators, and the proportional part of the Chamber of Deputies is elected based on the vote for the presidential candidates, while the deputies from the single-member districts are elected separately.

The legislative body was formerly known as the National Congress.

2020–2025 Congress

2015–2020 Congress

2010–2015 Congress

The 2010–2015 Plurinational Legislative Assembly were controlled in both houses by the governing Movement for Socialism (MAS-IPSP), elected with a 2/3 supermajority. Just four incumbent members of the 2005–2010 Congress returned: Deputy Antonio Franco; Deputy Javier Zabaleta (MAS-IPSP/MSM); Senator René Martínez (MAS-IPSP), who was a deputy; and Senator Róger Pinto, previously of Podemos and now representing PPB-CN. As part of a break between the MAS-IPSP and its ally the Without Fear Movement (MSM), the latter party's four deputies, elected on the MAS slate pledged in late March 2010, "to act in accord with our political identity, with our conscience, and with the people who elected us with their vote." Consequently, MAS-IPSP now has 84 members in the Chambers of Deputies, while the MSM has four.

Congressional elections were held as part of general elections on 9 December 2009. After the votes were counted, party strengths in Congress were as follows:

The President of the Senate was Ana María Romero de Campero (MAS-IPSP, La Paz), elected on 19 January 2010, but she died on 26 October 2010. Seventeen of 36 members of the Senate are women. The 26-member MAS-IPSP majority includes all four senators from La Paz, Oruro, and Potosí; three senators from Cochabamba and Chuquisaca; and two senators from each of Santa Cruz, Beni, Pando, and Tarija.

The President of the Chamber of Deputies, elected on 19 January 2010, is Héctor Arce (MAS-IPSP). 33 of 130 deputies (25.38%) are women.

Prior Congresses

2005–2010 Congress
Congressional elections were held on 18 December 2005, concurrently with the 2005 presidential election.

The Chamber of Deputies had the following leadership: President Edmundo Novillo Aguilar (MAS, Cochabamba); First Vice President Julia Ramos (MAS); Second Vice President Oscar Urenda (Social Democratic Power, Podemos); First Secretary Oscar Chirinos (MAS); Second Secretary Alex Cerrogrande (MAS); Third Secretary Jorge Becerra (National Unity Front, UN), and Fourth Secretary Roxana Sandoval (Revolutionary Nationalist Movement, MNR).

2002–2005 Congress
Congressional elections were held on 30 June 2002. After the votes were counted, party strengths in Congress were as follows:

The next election was scheduled to take place in June 2007, but was brought forward to December 2005 on a decision from interim President Eduardo Rodríguez.

Buildings

The two chambers of Congress meet in the legislative palace located on Plaza Murillo, La Paz's main city-centre square. Plaza Murillo is also flanked by the presidential palace (informally known as the Palacio Quemado – the "Burnt Palace" – on account of repeated attempts to raze it to the ground in the 19th century) and the cathedral of Nuestra Señora de La Paz. Prior to becoming the seat of the legislature in 1904, the congress building had, at different times, housed a convent and a university.

The Vice-President, in his capacity as President of Congress, has an imposing suite of offices on Calle Mercado in central La Paz. The building, designed by Emilio Villanueva, was erected during the 1920s and was originally intended to serve as the headquarters of Bolivia's central bank (Banco de la Nación Boliviana). Under Jaime Paz Zamora's 1989–1993 presidency, the building was reassigned to the vice-presidency, but the vice-presidential staff did not relocate entirely until major reconstruction and renovation work, starting in 1997, had been carried out. The Library of Congress and the National Congressional Archive are also located on the premises.

Members

Chamber of Deputies
List of members of the Chamber of Deputies of Bolivia, 1997–2002
List of members of the Chamber of Deputies of Bolivia, 2002–2005
List of members of the Chamber of Deputies of Bolivia, 2005–2009

Senate
List of members of the Chamber of Senators of Bolivia, 1997–2002
List of members of the Chamber of Senators of Bolivia, 2002–2005
List of members of the Chamber of Senators of Bolivia, 2005–2009

See also
President of the Chamber of Senators of Bolivia
President of the Chamber of Deputies of Bolivia
Politics of Bolivia
List of legislatures by country

Notes

References

External links

Senate
Chamber of Deputies

 
Bicameral legislatures
Government of Bolivia
Bolivia
Politics of Bolivia
1825 establishments in Bolivia